Daniell is a surname. Notable people with the surname include:

 Alexander Daniell (1599–1668), Cornish landowner
 Alfred Daniell (1853–1937)
 Ave Daniell (1914–1999), American (gridiron) footballer
 Charles Daniell (1827–1889), Major-General, British Army
 David Daniell (author) (1929–2016), biographer of William Tyndale
 David Daniell (cyclist) (born 1989), English competitive cyclist
 David Daniell (musician) (born 1972), American guitarist and composer
 David Scott Daniell (1906–1965)
 Edward Daniell (cricketer) (1815–1875), English cricketer
 Edward Thomas Daniell (1804–1842), English landscape painter and etcher
 Francis Henry Blackburne Daniell (1845 – 10 February 1921) was an Anglo-Irish barrister and historian
 Geoffrey Daniell (1516–1586)
 George Daniell (medical doctor) (1864–1937), medical practitioner and anaesthesiologist
 George Daniell (photographer) (1911-2002), American photographer
 George Daniell (priest) (1853–1931), English Anglican priest
 Gladys Daniell (1884–1962)
 Harold Daniell (1909–1967), British racing motorcyclist
 Henry Daniell (1894–1963), British actor
 Jim Daniell (1918–1983), American (gridiron) footballer
 John Daniell (cricketer) (1878–1963), English rugby player and Cricketer
 John Daniell (rugby union) (born 1972), New Zealand writer and rugby player
 John Frederic Daniell (1790–1845), British chemist and physicist
 Leaf Daniell (1877–1913)
 Louisa Daniell (1808–1871)
 Madeline Daniell (1832–1906)
 Marcus Daniell (born 1989), New Zealand tennis player
 Martin H. Daniell (born 1935)
 Percy John Daniell (1889–1946), British mathematician
 Peter Daniell (1584–1652)
 Robert Daniell (1646–1718), Governor of North Carolina
 Roy Daniell (born 1965)
 Samuel Daniell (1775–1811), English landscape painter
 Thomas Daniell (1749–1840), RA, English landscape painter
 Warren Daniell (1826–1913), US Representative
 William Daniell (died 1604) (by 1531 – 1604) was the member of the Parliament of England for Marlborough
 William Daniell (1665–1698) was the member of the Parliament of England for Marlborough
 William Daniell (1769–1837), RA, English landscape and marine painter, and engraver
 William Freeman Daniell (1818–1865), British army surgeon and botanist
 William Swift Daniell (1865 - June 28, 1933) was an American painter

Other
 Daniell Revenaugh (born 1934)
 Daniell Smith-Christopher
 Daniell Zeleny (born 1988)

See also
 Daniell cell, an electrochemical cell invented by John Frederick Daniell
 Daniell integral, a generalized form of mathematical integral proposed by Percy Daniell
 Daniell (crater), a lunar crater named after John Frederic Daniell
 Cape Daniell
 Daniell Peninsula
 Lake Daniell